The family Castoridae contains the two living species of beavers and their fossil relatives. A highly diverse group of rodents within this family once roamed the earth, but only a single genus is extant today, Castor.

Characteristics 

Castorids are medium-sized mammals, although large compared with most other rodents. They are semiaquatic, with sleek bodies and webbed hind feet, and are more agile in the water than on land. Their tails are flattened and scaly, adaptations that help them manoeuvre in the water.
Castorids live in small family groups that each occupy a specific territory, based around a lodge and dam constructed from sticks and mud. They are herbivores, feeding on leaves and grasses in the summer, and woody plants such as willow in the winter. They have powerful incisors and the typical rodent dental formula:

Evolution 
 
The earliest castorids belong to the genus Agnotocastor, known from the late Eocene and Oligocene of North America and Asia. Other early castorids included genera such as Steneofiber, from the Oligocene and Miocene of Europe, the earliest member of the subfamily Castorinae, which contains castorids closely related to living beavers. Their teeth were not well suited to gnawing wood, suggesting this habit evolved at a later point, but they do appear adapted to semiaquatic living. Later, such early species evolved into forms such as Palaeocastor from the Miocene of Nebraska.
 

Giant forms evolved in the Pleistocene, including Trogontherium in Europe, and Castoroides in North America. The latter animal was as large as a black bear, yet had a brain only marginally larger than that of modern beavers. Its shape suggests it would have been a good swimmer, and it probably lived in swampy habitats.

Taxonomy 
McKenna and Bell divided Castoridae into two subfamilies, Castoroidinae and Castorinae.  More recent studies  have recognized two additional subfamilies of basal castorids, Agnotocastorinae and Palaeocastorinae, which is followed here.  Within the family, Castorinae and Castoroidinae are sister taxa; they share a more recent common ancestor with each other than with members of the other two subfamilies.   Both subfamilies include semiaquatic species capable of constructing dams. The Palaeocastorinae include beavers that are interpreted as fossorial (burrowing), as are nothodipoidins and Migmacastor.  The following taxonomy is based on Korth and Rybczynski, with preference given to the latter where these differ.

Family Castoridae
†Migmacastor
Subfamily †Agnotocastorinae (paraphyletic)
Tribe †Agnotocastorini
†Agnotocastor
†Neatocastor
Tribe †Anchitheriomyini
†Anchitheriomys
†Propalaeocastor
†Oligotheriomys
Subfamily †Palaeocastorinae
†Palaeocastor
†Capacikala
†Pseudopalaeocastor
Tribe †Euhapsini
†Euhapsis
†Fossorcastor
Subfamily †Castoroidinae
†Priusaulax (placement in Castoroidinae questionable)
Tribe †Nothodipoidini
†Eucastor
†Microdipoides
†Nothodipoides
Tribe †Castoroidini (paraphyletic)
†Monosaulax
†Prodipoides
†Dipoides
†Castoroides
†Procastoroides
Tribe †Trogontheriini
†Trogontherium
†Boreofiber
†Euroxenomys
†Youngofiber
†Asiacastor
Subfamily Castorinae
†Chalicomys (also incorrectly "Palaeomys")
†Steneofiber
†Zamolxifiber
†Romanofiber
†Schreuderia
†Sinocastor
†Hystricops
Castor - modern beavers
North American beaver, Castor canadensis
Eurasian beaver, Castor fiber
†Castor californicus

References 

Rodent families
Beavers
Extant Eocene first appearances
Taxa named by Wilhelm Hemprich
Semiaquatic animals